Meering is a geographically small civil parish in the Newark and Sherwood district of Nottinghamshire, England. With a population of zero (2001 census), it is grouped with Girton to form a parish meeting. The parish was originally an extra-parochial area, and was once populated, although not in more than single figures since census records began.

The parish is bound by the Carlton Rack river to the west (which forms the border with Sutton on Trent) and to the east a lagoon and a brook separates it from Girton civil parish.

References 

Civil parishes in Nottinghamshire
Newark and Sherwood